The 2016–17 Mizoram Premier League was the fifth season of the Mizoram Premier League, the top-division football league in the Indian state of Mizoram. The league began on 1 September 2016 with eight teams competing. The league final took place on 16 December with Chanmari defeating Bethlehem VT 3–0.

Aizawl were the defending champions coming into the season.

Teams
 Aizawl
 BVT
 Chanmari
 Chanmari West
 Chhinga Veng
 Dinthar
 Ramhlun North
 Zo United

League table

Finals

Bracket

Semi-finals

Leg 1

Leg 2

Final

Awards
After the league final, the following awards and respective winners were announced:

References

External links
 Mizoram Premier League on facebook.

Mizoram Premier League
2016–17 in Indian football leagues